Dystaenia is a genus of flowering plants belonging to the family Apiaceae.

Its native range is Temperate Eastern Asia.

Species:

Dystaenia ibukiensis 
Dystaenia takeshimana

References

Apioideae
Apioideae genera